The 2015 KPL Top 8 Cup was the fourth edition of the tournament, which kicked off on 26 September and ended on 7 November. It is set to be contested by the top 8 teams of the 2014 season of the Kenyan Premier League: A.F.C. Leopards, Chemelil Sugar, Gor Mahia, Muhoroni Youth, Sofapaka, Tusker and Ulinzi Stars. The winners of the tournament will receive KSh.  in prize money.

Tusker were the defending champions of the competition, having won their second title in the previous season after beating A.F.C. Leopards 2–1 in the final played at the Kinoru Stadium in Meru. However, they were knocked out by eventual champions Gor Mahia in the semi-finals, beating Sony Sugar in the final after extra time to pick up their second title of the competition and their third title of the 2015 season.

Competition format

The tournament follows a single-elimination format for the quarter-finals and the final, where the winning team immediately advances to the next round or wins the tournament, respectively.

For the semi-finals, the tournament adopts a double-elimination format, where a team must win two legs to advance to the final. If both teams are equal on aggregate goals at the end of the two legs, a penalty shoot-out will be conducted to determine who advances to the final. The away goals rule also applies in this round.

2014 Kenyan Premier League standings

Bracket

Quarter-finals
The draw for the quarter-finals was held on 4 September. Teams placed first to fourth on the league table were placed in one pot, while teams placed fifth to eighth were placed in another pot.

Fixtures
The matches are scheduled to take place on the weekend of 26–27 September.

Semi-finals
The draw for the semi-finals was held on 27 September, after the final quarter-final between Tusker and A.F.C. Leopards.

First leg
The first leg matches took place on 17 October.

Second leg
The second leg matches took place on 4 November.

Sony Sugar win 5–3 on aggregate.

Gor Mahia win 4–3 on aggregate.

Final
The final was played on 7 November.

Goalscorers
4 goals
  Meddie Kagere (Gor Mahia)

3 goals
  Michael Olunga (Gor Mahia)

2 goals

  Eugene Asike (Tusker)
  Andrew Ssekayombya (Sony Sugar)
  Jesse Were (Tusker)

1 goal

  Ali Abondo (Gor Mahia)
  Victor Ademba (Sony Sugar)
  John Baraza (Sofapaka)
  Marwa Chambiri (Sony Sugar)
  Lamine Diallo (A.F.C. Leopards)
  Meshack Karani (Chemelil Sugar)
  Martin Kiiza (A.F.C. Leopards)
  Kevin Kimani (Tusker)
  David Mbatiye (Sofapaka)
  Humphrey Mieno (Tusker)
  Justine Monda (Sony Sugar)
  Felly Mulumba (Sofapaka)
  Ekaliana Ndolo (Sofapaka)
  George Odhiambo (Gor Mahia)
  Byron Odiaga (Sony Sugar)
  Samuel Olwande (Chemelil Sugar)
  Brian Osumba (Tusker)
  Collins Shivachi (Sofapaka)
  Oscar Wamalwa (Ulinzi Stars)

1 own goal
  Collins Shivachi (Sofapaka; against Sony Sugar)

Team statistics

|-
|colspan="20"|Eliminated in the semi-finals
|-

|-
|colspan="20"|Eliminated in the quarter-finals
|-

Notes

References

KPL Top 8 Cup seasons
Top 8 Cup